William Owen (September 10, 1825 – August 21, 1894) was a member of the Wisconsin State Assembly.

Biography
Owen was born on September 10, 1825 in Llanelltyd, Wales. His parents were John and Mary (Maesygarnedd) Owen. His family immigrated to Wisconsin in 1846. He married Margaret Jones in 1853. After residing in Portage, Wisconsin, he moved to Cambria, Wisconsin in 1858 and became involved in the wheat and lumber industries. He moved to Randolph, Wisconsin in 1867 and began farming. Owen and his family were Calvinistic Methodists. His brother, David, was also a member of the Assembly. He died on August 21, 1894, in Caledonia, Wisconsin.

Assembly career
Owen was a member of the Assembly during the Legislature of 1865. He was a Republican.

References

People from Merionethshire
Welsh emigrants to the United States
19th-century Methodists
People from Portage, Wisconsin
Republican Party members of the Wisconsin State Assembly
Farmers from Wisconsin
1825 births
People from Cambria, Wisconsin
People from Randolph, Wisconsin
1894 deaths